Claremore Mound, an ancient earthen platform mound in present-day Rogers County, Oklahoma, is the site of the Battle of Strawberry Moon (a.k.a. Battle of Claremore Mound). In June 1817, a band of Cherokee Indians and their allies, under Chief Spring Frog (Too-an-tuh), attacked Pasuga, an Osage Indian village at the foot of Claremore Mound, killing thirty-eight Osage, including their Chief Glahmo, and taking one hundred and four captives. In revenge, the Osage attacked the Cherokee for the next twenty years, led by Wah-tianka, Glahmo's son. The mound is located north of Sageeyah near the south bank of the Verdigris River. 

European-American settlers designated both the mound and the nearby town as Clermont ("clear mountain" in English) in honor of Chief Glahmo, who French traders had nicknamed Chief Clermont. When the town petitioned for a post office in 1874, a clerical error listed Clermont as Claremore; the error was never rectified and today both the mound and the town are named Claremore.

See also 
 Battle of Claremore Mound

References

External links
 Eaton, Rachel Caroline. "The Legend of the Battle of Claremore Mound", Chronicles of Oklahoma 8:4 (December 1930) 369-377 (accessed August 28, 2006).

Hills of Oklahoma
Pre-statehood history of Oklahoma
Landforms of Rogers County, Oklahoma